Tul Bahadur Pun VC  (Nepali: तुल बहादुर पुन; 23 March 192320 April 2011) was a Nepalese Gurkha recipient of the Victoria Cross, the highest award for gallantry in the face of the enemy that can be awarded to British and Commonwealth forces.  He later achieved the rank of Honorary Lieutenant.  In addition to the Victoria Cross, Pun was awarded 10 other medals, including the Burma Star.

Victoria Cross

Pun was 21 years old, and a Rifleman in the 3rd Battalion, 6th Gurkha Rifles, in the Indian Army during World War II when the following deed took place for which he was awarded the Victoria Cross:

On 23 June 1944 at Mogaung, Burma, during an attack on the railway bridge, a section of one of the platoons was wiped out with the exception of Rifleman Tul Bahadur Pun, his section commander and one other. The section commander immediately led a charge on the enemy position but was at once badly wounded, as was the third man. Rifleman Pun, with a Bren gun continued the charge alone in the face of shattering fire and reaching the position, killed three of the occupants and put five more to flight, capturing two light machine-guns and much ammunition. He then gave accurate supporting fire, enabling the rest of his platoon to reach their objective.

Citation

Despite the above text, Pun told a different story in an interview. He told that he had killed four with his gun and three with his kukri. Later he took a flamethrower and killed a further 30 Japanese in a dugout.

Pun was invited, along with other Victoria Cross recipients, to the coronation of Queen Elizabeth II on 2 June 1953. He attended the ceremony at Westminster Abbey, and was invited to the party afterwards at Buckingham Palace.

He made several visits to the United Kingdom, particularly to meet with other members of the Victoria Cross and George Cross Association. He had tea with Queen Elizabeth The Queen Mother.

Memorials

London 
Pun's name is inscribed on the roof of an arched memorial stand at the Memorial Gates, at Constitution Hill, London (at the junction with Duke of Wellington Place, London SW1), along with other volunteers from the Indian subcontinent, Africa, and the Caribbean, who served with the Armed Forces during the First and Second World Wars and received the Victoria Cross or George Cross. The memorial with his name inscribed is directly outside the walled gardens of Buckingham Palace.

In addition, as a recipient of the Victoria Cross, his name is inscribed on memorials at Westminster Abbey and the Union Jack Club, in London, and on the "Memorial to the Chindits" on the north side of the Victoria Embankment next to the Ministry of Defence headquarters in London.

Other 
He has also had a Great Western Railway operated IET unit named after him.

Immigration controversy 

In later life Pun suffered from ill-health, including heart problems, asthma and diabetes. He had difficulties getting medical attention and the medical supplies in Nepal, which were needed to keep him alive. He lived at the foothills of the Himalayas in Nepal at 4,000 feet. His house has no proper roof, no electricity, and no running water. In a statement given to his solicitors, Howe & Co, of Ealing, West London, Mr Pun stated that his home had no sanitation and that he was therefore obliged to dig a hole in the surrounding fields in order to pass as a toilet. He told the British press that he was in constant fear of landslides during the Nepalese monsoon season.

Pun received a British Army pension of £132 per month. In order to receive his monthly pension he had to be driven for three hours and then walk for one full day (being carried by two or three men in a wicker basket) to the Gurkha army camp at Pokhara. If he had ever failed to appear in person at the camp, he would not have received that month's pension.

Pun applied in 2006 to the British Embassy in Kathmandu, Nepal, for a visa to settle in the United Kingdom, particularly because of his ill-health and his desire to be with his veteran comrades in the United Kingdom. A British Entry Clearance Officer refused his application for settlement on the ground that he had "failed to demonstrate strong ties with the UK".

Pun then lodged an appeal against the immigration decision through his solicitors, Howe & Co. The immigration appeal was listed to be heard in August 2007 in London. On 1 June 2007, following widespread media publicity of the British public's support of Pun's case, the then Minister of State for Immigration Liam Byrne announced:

Pun began his journey to Britain on 1 July 2007. Around one thousand people turned up to see him off. There were traditional Nepali bands outside his home and a motorcade of around 30-50 cars and motorbikes took him to the airport so he could fly to Kathmandu. One of those who turned up to say farewell was old Gurkha friend and fellow VC recipient Lachhiman Gurung, 90, who lost a hand to a Japanese grenade in 1945.

He finally arrived at London, Heathrow, on 4 July and was met with an official guard of honour. Col David Hayes, of the Royal Gurkha Rifles, saluted him and said: "I wish to emphasise the manner in which he's revered by serving Gurkhas. His reputation goes before us into battle." Pun was then driven by limousine to a reception to meet hundreds of members of the public who had helped to bring him to Britain. The reception included many representatives from The Gurkha Ex-Servicemen's Organisation (GAESO)—and from the Army Rumour Service website.

Pun commented, "I have never had so much respect as in these two days, leaving Kathmandu and arriving in Britain."

Death
On 20 April 2011, after suffering severe respiratory ailments, Pun died unexpectedly in his home village of Myagdi, Nepal. He had briefly returned to see the completion of a school for the village, a project which he had been involved with.

Decorations and medals

His Victoria Cross is displayed at The Gurkha Museum, Winchester, Hampshire England.

Gallery

See also
List of Brigade of Gurkhas recipients of the Victoria Cross
Dipprasad Pun - Grandson, known for killing 30 Taliban terrorists, one of them with a GPMG tripod

References

External links
Chindits - London Gazette Citation
Tul Bahadur Pun
Gurkha VC Winners
Gurkha Army Ex-Servicemen's Organisation
The Telegraph "Land fit for heroes? Not if you're Gurkhas" by Vicki Woods, 30 June 2007
BBC News 24 "Gurkha tells of citizenship joy"
BBC News 24 "Gurkha hero appeals for UK entry "
This Is London "VC Hero Gurkha Banned from Living in Britain 'Because He Has No Strong Ties with UK'"
Sunday Times "A rape conviction is better than a VC if you want to stay in Britain"
Belfast Telegraph "Risk your life for us ... then bugger off!"
Sunday Post, "Scotland Gurkhas have earned the right to be here"
EuroSoc "Shame"
NewKerala.com "UK bans Victoria Cross Gurkha hero"
Daily India "UK bans Victoria Cross Gurkha hero"
Malaysia Sun "UK bans Victoria Cross Gurkha hero"
The Himalayan Times "VC Hero Ex-Gurkha Veteran Denied UK Visa"
Anorak "Gurkha Tul Bahadur Pun: Payback Time"
Daily India.com "Tory Peer takes up cudgels for Gurkha hero"
"Train named after Gurkha hero Tulbahadur Pun"

20th-century births
2011 deaths
People from Myagdi District
Nepalese World War II recipients of the Victoria Cross
British Indian Army soldiers
Nepalese people of World War II
Nepalese emigrants to the United Kingdom
Gurkhas
British Army personnel of the Malayan Emergency
Royal Gurkha Rifles soldiers
Indian Army personnel of World War II